Enteropogon is a genus of tropical and subtropical plants in the grass family. It is widespread across many parts of Asia, Africa, Australia, the Americas, and various islands.

 Species
 Enteropogon acicularis (Lindl.) Lazarides - curly windmill grass, large windmill grass, umbrella grass - Australia
 Enteropogon barbatus C.E.Hubb. - Ethiopia, Somalia, Kenya
 Enteropogon brandegeei (Vasey) Clayton - Baja California, Baja California Sur
 Enteropogon chlorideus (Presl) Clayton - buryseed umbrella grass, verdillo cacahuatoide - Arizona, Texas, Mesoamerica
 Enteropogon coimbatorensis K.K.N.Nair, S.K.Jain & M.P.Nayar - India
 Enteropogon dolichostachyus (Lag.) Keng - Yemen, Oman, Afghanistan, Indian Subcontinent, Indochina, southern China, Philippines, Malaysia, Indonesia, New Guinea, northern Australia, Micronesia
 Enteropogon longiaristatus (Napper) Clayton - Tanzania
 Enteropogon macrostachyus Munro ex Benth. - bushrye - Zimbabwe, Mozambique, Limpopo, Mpumalanga, Gauteng, North West Province
 Enteropogon minutus Lazarides - northern Australia
 Enteropogon mollis (Nees) Clayton - Central America, West Indies, northern South America, Galápagos
 Enteropogon monostachyus Schum. - Somalia, Tanzania, Mozambique, Zambia, Eswatini, KwaZulu-Natal, Mpumalanga, Limpopo, India, Sri Lanka, Myanmar
 Enteropogon paucispiceus (Lazarides) B.K.Simon - Queensland
 Enteropogon prieurii (Kunth) Clayton - drier parts of Africa; Saudi Arabia, Yemen, India
 Enteropogon ramosus B.K.Simon - tussock umbrella grass - Australia
 Enteropogon rupestris (J.A.Schmidt) A.Chev. - drier parts of Africa
 Enteropogon seychellarum Benth. - Somalia, Kenya, Tanzania, Mozambique, Zambia, Madagascar, Seychelles, Aldabra 
 Enteropogon unispiceus (F.Muell.) Clayton - Taiwan, Queensland, New South Wales, Cook Islands

 formerly included
see Microchloa 
 Enteropogon muticus - Microchloa altera

References

Chloridoideae
Poaceae genera